Tunes is a railway station on the Algarve line, which serves Tunes, in the Silves municipality, Portugal. It opened on the 1st of July 1889, and is the junction of the Algarve and southern lines.

References 

Railway stations in Portugal